"Pardon my French" or "Excuse my French" is a common English language phrase ostensibly disguising profanity as words from the French language. The phrase is uttered in an attempt to excuse the user of profanity, swearing, or curses in the presence of those offended by it, under the pretense of the words being part of a foreign language.

Usage
At least one source suggests that the phrase "derives from a literal usage of the exclamation. In the 19th century, when English people used French expressions in conversation they often apologized for it – presumably because many of their listeners (then as now) wouldn't be familiar with the language". The definition cites an example from The Lady's Magazine, 1830:

"Excuse my French" appears an 1895 edition of Harper's Weekly, where an American tourist asked about the  architecture of Europe says "Palaces be durned! Excuse my French." The phrase "pardon my French" is recorded in the 1930s and may be a result of English-speaking troops returning from the First World War.

The phrase has been used in broadcast television and family films where less offensive words are preceded by "pardon my French" to intensify their effect without violating censorship or rating guidelines. An example is in the movie Ferris Bueller's Day Off; Cameron Frye says, "Pardon my French, but you’re an asshole" on a phone call with Edward Rooney.

Related expressions

Incidentally, several expressions are used by both the English and the French to describe the same culturally unacceptable habit, but attributing the habit to the other people:
 "to take a French leave" (to depart a party or other gathering without taking polite leave of one's host) is referenced in French as filer à l'anglaise (lit. "leave English-style").
 "French letter" (now somewhat archaic; referring to a condom) is rendered in French as capote anglaise ("English hood" or "English cap").
 During the 16th century in England, genital herpes was called the "French disease" and "French-sick" was a term for syphilis, while in France, it was called le Mal de Naples (the Napoli disease), after the syphilis outbreak in 1494/1495 while French troops were besieging Naples (History of syphilis, Syphilis).
 "French kiss" (A "kiss with the tongue" stimulates the partner's lips, tongue and mouth) is referred to in French as baiser or une pelle (very colloquial, lit. "a shovel").

Notes

References

English phrases
English profanity